Ardeşen (Laz and Georgian: არტაშენი/Artasheni or არდაშენი/Ardasheni; Armenian: Արտաշեն/Artashen) is a town in Rize Province in the Black Sea region of Turkey,  along the coast road from the city of Rize. It is the seat of Ardeşen District. Its population is 30,645 (2021).

History
See Rize Province for the history of the area, at one time part of the Colchis and Lazica kingdoms, Roman, Byzantine Empires and Kingdom of Georgia and later the Empire of Trebizond until their defeat in 1461 by the Ottoman Sultan Mehmet II. The origins of the name is believed to be Armenian coming from Ard- meaning field and -Shen meaning village. Also, it might be Lazuri Arteşeni coming from Ar-meaning one, te- meaning light, şeni- meaning for, Arteşeni in lazuri meaning "for a few light". It is logical because of rainy and cloudy weather of the area.

Geography
There is plenty of rainfall but little land flat enough for planting anything except for tea, and life is hard in these wet highlands. The highland villages are remote, and reaching them with roads, cables and other infrastructure is very challenging.

This was even more the case before tea planting began, when successive generations would migrate away from the area to jobs in Turkey's larger cities or abroad. 10% of the land is used for tea growing, other than is there is little agriculture except gardening for local consumption. The first tea-processing factory was opened in 1947, other industry includes sawmills and furniture workshops. 

The industrial development is in the town of Ardeşen itself, which is on the coast near the mouth of the Fırtına River. Ardeşen has a lot of beautiful public buildings and apartment blocks. The busy coast road through Ardeşen leads up to Turkey's border with Georgia (country). The cuisine is like the typical Turkish menu, but there are a lot of special foods typical for the region like minci / cökelek or muhlama to mention only some of the rich kitchen of Ardeşen . Ardeşen  has some local radio, TV and newspapers, like Ardeşen'in Sesi.

The income from tea growing has brought better amenities to Ardeşen but the traditional rural lifestyle persists; many of the people in the countryside are ethnic Laz and the older generations in particular continue to speak the Laz language although their traditional clothing has disappeared with the ban on growing hemp. However education is quite successful with literacy rates of 97% among men and 89% among women.

The people of Ardeşen have a reputation for their love of firearms, most people carry them and home-made small arms are a thriving trade, (to such an extent that in 1991 the state established a factory here to produce them legally and try and bring the industry under control ). Even the municipality logo features a picture of a mosque and a revolver.

The municipality consists of the following 23 quarters: Bahar, Başmahalle, Cami, Düz, Elmalık, Kahveciler, Kavaklıdere, Kuzey, Merkez, Müftü, Şentepe, Yayla, Yenimahalle, Barış, Deniz, Fırtına, Çiftekavak, Işıklı, Yavuzselim, Cumhuriyet, Fatih, Konaktepe and Taşbaşı.

Climate
Ardeşen has an oceanic climate (Köppen: Cfb).

Sport
The Ardeşen GSK, a women's handball club, play in the Turkish Women's Handball Super League.

Places of interest
Fırtına Deresi, a river running down from the Kaçkars, is used for rafting.
Tunca (Dutxe), where the 'formulaz' traditional car races take place.

References

External links

 Ardeşen municipality's official website
and more photos
 Lazuri - information on the Laz language and culture
 Ardeşenim - General local site on the district

 
Populated places in Ardeşen District
Black Sea port cities and towns in Turkey
Fishing communities in Turkey
Populated coastal places in Turkey
Laz settlements in Turkey